Kangari Hills Forest Reserve is a non-hunting forest reserve in the centre of Sierra Leone.  The area became a forest reserve in 1924.  Lying between 200 and 500 metres above sea level, the reserve has an area of 8,573 hectares (85.73 km), although parts of it area have been encroached upon by farming and mining. The Reserve is one of the few places in Sierra Leone where the endangered forest elephant survives.

See also
 Protected areas of Sierra Leone

References

Forest reserves of Sierra Leone